The conflicts between the Göktürks and the Sassanid Empire include:
 First Perso-Turkic War (588–589)
 Second Perso-Turkic War (606–608)
 Third Perso-Turkic War (627–629)

Wars involving the Sasanian Empire